Armathwaite Hall is a luxury hotel and spa adjacent to Bassenthwaite Lake, in Cumbria.

History
The present hall dates back to circa 1500; it was acquired by the Highmore family in 1540, by James Spedding (squire to Lord Egremont) in 1748 and then by Sir Frederick Fletcher-Vane (who had the courtyard and chapel added) in 1796. Ownership then passed to John Boustead (who owned coffee plantations in Ceylon and who had the hall extensively enlarged) in 1850. It then passed to Thomas Hartley (a local mine owner who had the hall extended to the designs of Charles John Ferguson) in 1880, to the Wivell family (owners of the Keswick Hotel) in 1926 and to the Graves family (the current owners) in 1976. It is now a hotel.

See also
Hugh Boustead

References

Country houses in Cumbria
Grade II listed buildings in Cumbria
Grade II listed houses
Hotels in Cumbria
Restaurants in England
Hotel spas
Country house hotels